The Reaper is a public art work by artist Gustav Bohland, located on the south side of Milwaukee, Wisconsin. The bronze sculpture depicts an agricultural worker dressed in overalls and a wide-brimmed hat. One hand rests against his hip, and the other hand grasps the snath of a scythe that rests across his shoulders. The tool's toe and cline hang behind the figure's back. His boots rest on a small round base mounted on a circular flagstone pedestal. The artwork is located at the former corporate headquarters of Froedtert Malting Company which is now the US headquarters of MaltEurop.

See also
 Bird and Fish
 The Sower

References

1952 establishments in Wisconsin
1952 sculptures
Bronze sculptures in Wisconsin
Outdoor sculptures in Milwaukee
Sculptures of men in Wisconsin
Statues in Wisconsin